Eileen is a comic opera with music by Victor Herbert and lyrics and book by Henry Blossom, based loosely on the 1835 novel Rory O'More by Herbert's grandfather, Samuel Lover. Set in 1798, the story concerns an Irish revolutionary arrested by the British for treason. Eileen, his nobly born sweetheart, helps him to escape by disguising him as a servant.

After two Cleveland performances at the Colonial Theatre on January 1–2, 1917 titled Hearts of Erin, the operetta moved on to Boston, changing its name to Eileen. It then opened at the Shubert Theatre on March 19, 1917 and ran for 64 performances. It was produced by Joe Weber, formerly of the comedy duo Weber and Fields. It then toured, but a fire destroyed its sets and costumes three months into the tour. The show was not revived in New York until the end of the 20th century. In 1982, a single on-book concert performance was given at Manhattan's Town Hall, featuring E. G. Marshall as O'Day, Judy Kaye as Lady Maude and Roderick Cook as Sir Reginald. In 1997, it was produced and recorded by the Ohio Light Opera. In 2012, a small-scale production was given by the Light Opera of New York.

Herbert was eager to write an "Irish" musical to celebrate the land of his ancestors. His score was well received by the critics, but the libretto received some harsh reviews. Alexander Woollcott wrote: "Mr Blossom [must have] gathered his material and atmosphere by reading for quite half an hour in some public library."

Roles and original cast
Eileen Mulvaney, niece of Lady Maude (soprano) – Grace Breen
Captain Barry O'Day, a fine Irish Rebel (tenor) – Walter Scanlan
Lady Maude Estabrooke, Eileen's Aunt – Olga Roller
Colonel Lester, the local British authority – Edward Martindel
Shaun Dhu, Barry's steadfast mate – Greek Evans
Sir Reginald Stribling, a British Knight – Algernon Grieg
Rosie Flynn – Louise Allen
Biddy Flynn – F. Josie Claflin
"Humpy" Grogan, the British tax collector – John B. Cooke
Lanty Hackett – Harry Crosby
Mickey O'Brien – Joseph Dillon
Dinny Doyle – Scott Welsh
Chorus of Villagers

Synopsis
Act I
It is 1798, the year of the brutal uprisings of the United Irishmen, who seek to reclaim their lands from the British. Lady Maude, the attractive widow of Lord Estabrook, an English lady, is the mistress of Castle Sligo, once held by the O'Day family, creating resentment among the Irish locals. Her niece, Eileen, has returned to Ireland after schooling at a convent in France; she is accompanied by the bumbling Sir Reginald. Shaun Dhu leads a band of smugglers and revolutionaries on the Western coast of Ireland that includes Barry O'Day, son of a legendary Irish rebel. The band stores its loot at Biddy's Black Bull Inn in an effort to avoid nasty British tax collector Humpy Grogan. Lady Maude and Eileen stop at the Inn when their carriage breaks down. Barry protects them from some village drunks and flirts with Maude, although it is really Eileen who has caught his eye; Maude is sympathetic to the rebels' cause. Colonel Lester, the local British authority, comes to arrest Barry for treason, but Lady Maude keeps the Colonel at bay, and Barry escapes disguised as Lady Maude's groom.

Act II
Later, at Castle Sligo, Lady Maude has developed affection for Barry. Eileen explains that Barry is a rogue.  Nevertheless, Maude decides to help Barry escape again from the Colonel by putting a coachman's uniform on her guest, Sir Reggie, making him a decoy. Sir Reggie is arrested and sentenced to death before the Colonel learns that he has been fooled and that Barry has gotten away again.

Act III
By the time of Lady Maude's birthday, Eileen and Barry have fallen in love. Learning that Barry is there, the Colonel has his men surround the castle. Barry surrenders, and he is about to be shot, when news arrives that the King has pardoned the rebels. The arrest is reversed, various couples are united, including Barry and Eileen, and it is declared that "Ireland shall stand among all nations of the world."

Recordings
The show's hit song, "Thine Alone", has been frequently recorded. Al Goodman's orchestra and soloists recorded eight highlights from Eileen on a set of 78 RPM records. These selections were later reissued by RCA Camden on one side of a 12-inch LP (selections from Polonaise are on the reverse). This album has been out-of-print since the late 1950s. The Ohio Light Opera revived and recorded the musical in 1997, adapted by Quade Winter from Herbert's manuscripts, held in the collection of the Library of Congress (Newport Classics NPD 85615/2, double CD, 1998). 

In 2011, a recording starred Mary O'Sullivan in the title role and an "Orchestra of Ireland" (comprised of members of the two RTÉ orchestras) conducted by David Brophy "in a genuinely vital, colorful reading of this luscious score." (New World Records 80733-2, double CD, 2012).

Songs

Act I
 Free Trade and a Misty Moon – Shaun Dhu and Smuggler Chorus
 My Little Irish Rose – Rosie Flynn
 Ireland, My Sireland – Captain Barry O'Day
 Finale Act I (Glad, Triumphant Hour) – Entire Company

Act II
 Opening Act II (Round) – Female Chorus
 Too-re-loo-re – Eileen and Chorus
 Eileen, Alanna Asthore – Barry O'Day
 If Eve Had Left the Apple on the Bough – Sir "Reggie"
 I'd Love to be a Lady – Dinny Doyle and Rosie
 When Love Awakes! – Eileen and Girls
 Life's a Game at Best – Lady Maude and Colonel Lester
 Finale – Ensemble

Act III
 Opening Act III (In Erin's Isle) – Dinny, Lady Maude and Ensemble
 Thine Alone – Eileen and Barry O'Day
 The Irish Have a Great Day Tonight – Dinny and Men
 When Ireland Stands Among the Nations of the World – Barry O'Day and Ensemble

References

External links

"Eileen Brim Full of Rich Melodies", The New York Times, March 20, 1917, p. 9
Information about Scanlan and the show
Information about Herbert music

1917 musicals
1917 operas
Broadway musicals
English-language operettas
Musicals based on novels
Operas by Victor Herbert
Operas based on novels